Périgueux Foot is a football club located in Périgueux, France. The team plays in the Départemental 2, the tenth tier of French football. The club's colours are red and white.

History 
In 1978, FC Fossemagne, who were at the time playing in the Division d'Honneur, merged with US Gour de l'Arche to create FC Périgueux. The club entered the newly-created Division 4 in its first season in existence. From 1979 to 1990, the club went up and down between the Division 3 and the Division 4. However, in 1990, the club suffered relegation to the Division d'Honneur, returning to regional level football. The same year, the club was renamed to RC Périgueux. Périgueux has played at a regional level ever since. In 1998, a merger with  meant that the club now became Périgueux Foot.

The club's best-ever performance in the Coupe de France was in the 1986–87 edition, when the club reached the round of 16.

Name changes 

 19??–1978: FC Fossemagne
 1978–1990: FC Périgueux (FC Fossemagne merged with US Gour de l'Arche)
 1990–1998: RC Périgueux (club renamed)
 1998–present: Périgueux Foot (RC Périgueux merged with )

Managerial history 

 1979:  Georges Peyroche
 1980–1981:  Pierre Alonzo
 1983–1988:  Bernard Caron (player-manager; joint-manager from 1986 to 1988)
 1986–1988:   (player-manager; joint-manager from 1986 to 1988)
 1991:  Georges Peyroche
 1991–1994:  
 1994–1995:  Christian Zajaczkowski
  Denis Flamin (interim)
2010–20??:  Thierry Heller
 2016–20??: Lakbir Nasser
  Alexis Jouandeau

Notable former players 

  Bernard Caron
  Claude Chazottes
  Serge Allicot
  Bruno Cheravola
  Thierry Heller
  Christian Zajaczkowski
  Alexis Jouandeau
  Jean-Michel Malirat

Honours

Notes

References

External links 

 Club website 
Association football clubs established in 1998
1998 establishments in France
Sport in Dordogne
1978 establishments in France
Association football clubs established in 1978
Football clubs in Nouvelle-Aquitaine